= Jhangi Hamid =

- Town
- Location within Pakistan
- Coordinates: 33.16°N 73.15°E
- Country: Pakistan
- Province: (Islamabad Capital Territory) Islamabad C.T
- Elevation: 499 m (1,637 ft)

Population
  - Total: 117,591
- Time zone: UTC+5 (PST)

Jhangi Hamid is a town in the Islamabad Capital Territory of Pakistan. It is located at 33° 16' 35N 73° 15' 10E with an altitude of 499 metres (1640 feet).
